Cecil Ashworth Kershaw (3 February 1895 – 1 November 1972) was a British Olympian and England rugby international during the 1920s.

Fencing career
Kershaw was an Olympic fencer who competed for Great Britain at two Olympic Games He was a three times British fencing champion, winning the sabre title at the British Fencing Championships in 1920, 1925 and 1926.

Rugby
He was also a rugby union player who represented the Royal Navy as a scrum-half and was capped by England 16 times between 1920 and 1923. Kershaw formed a notable half-back partnership with W. J. A. Davies for both the Navy and England; in their 14 matches together for England they never finished on the losing side.

References

External links
 

1895 births
1972 deaths
British male fencers
England international rugby union players
English rugby union players
Fencers at the 1920 Summer Olympics
Fencers at the 1924 Summer Olympics
Olympic fencers of Great Britain
Royal Navy rugby union players
Rugby union scrum-halves
Sportspeople from Dhaka